Washington Township is one of the nineteen townships of Wood County, Ohio, United States.  The 2010 census found 1,841 people in the township, 1,474 of whom lived in the unincorporated portions of the township.

Geography
Located in the northwestern part of the county along the Maumee River, it borders the following townships:
Waterville Township, Lucas County - north
Middleton Township - northeast
Plain Township - southeast
Weston Township - southwest
Grand Rapids Township - west
Providence Township, Lucas County - northwest

The village of Tontogany is located in south central Washington Township, and the unincorporated community of Otsego lies in the township's northeast.

Name and history
Washington Township was established in 1837. It is one of forty-three Washington Townships in Ohio.

Government
The township is governed by a three-member board of trustees, who are elected in November of odd-numbered years to a four-year term beginning on the following January 1. Two are elected in the year after the presidential election and one is elected in the year before it. There is also an elected township fiscal officer, who serves a four-year term beginning on April 1 of the year after the election, which is held in November of the year before the presidential election. Vacancies in the fiscal officership or on the board of trustees are filled by the remaining trustees.

References

External links
County website

Townships in Wood County, Ohio
Townships in Ohio